Robert C. Becklin (May 17, 1926 – August 10, 2012) was an American businessman and politician.

Becklin was born in Braham, Minnesota. He lived in Cambridge, Minnesota and graduated from Cambridge High School. Becklin served in the United States Army during World War II. He worked for the United States Postal Service as a clerk and letter carrier. Becklin was also involved with the banking and charcoal businesses. Becklin served in the Minnesota House of Representatives from 1963 to 1972 and was a Republican. He died in Cambridge, Minnesota.

Notes

1926 births
2012 deaths
People from Braham, Minnesota
People from Cambridge, Massachusetts
Military personnel from Minnesota
United States Postal Service people
Businesspeople from Minnesota
Republican Party members of the Minnesota House of Representatives
20th-century American businesspeople
United States Army personnel of World War II